Gustave III may refer to:

People
King Gustav III of Sweden

Operas
Daniel Auber's opera, Gustave III (Auber) with a libretto by Eugène Scribe, 1833
Giuseppe Verdi's opera, Gustavo III (Verdi) from a libretto by Antonio Somma, 1857